Everaldo Marques da Silva (11 September 1944 – 28 October 1974), nicknamed Everaldo, was a footballer from Brazil who played as a left back for Grêmio and the Brazil national team. He won the 1970 FIFA World Cup. The golden star in Grêmio's flag was added in 1970 in his homage.

Club career
Everaldo was born in Porto Alegre. He spent his entire club career with Grêmio except for a loan at Juventude.

He died in a car accident on 28 October 1974 in Santa Cruz do Sul.

International career
Everaldo had 24 caps with the Brazil national team between 1967 and 1972. The first one was obtained in June 1967.

Everaldo won the 1970 FIFA World Cup. He was defeated only once, in October 1968.

Honours
Brazil
 FIFA World Cup: 1970
 Roca Cup: 1967

Grêmio
 Campeonato Gaúcho: 1964, 1966, 1967, 1968
 Rio Branco Cup: 1967

Individual
 Brazilian Silver Ball: 1970

References

External links
 Everaldo: a star shining in the Tricolor flag from the Grêmio website.

1944 births
1974 deaths
Footballers from Porto Alegre
Brazilian footballers
Association football defenders
Brazil international footballers
1970 FIFA World Cup players
FIFA World Cup-winning players
Esporte Clube Juventude players
Grêmio Foot-Ball Porto Alegrense players
Campeonato Brasileiro Série A players
Road incident deaths in Brazil